KNDN (960 AM) is a radio station broadcasting in Navajo, one of three such stations in the world. Licensed to Farmington, New Mexico, United States, the station serves the Four Corners area.  The station is currently owned by Basin Broadcasting Co.

References

External links
KNDN Facebook

Native American radio
NDN
Navajo mass media
NDN